Ryan Coiner (born September 7, 1979) is an American former professional soccer forward who played in Germany and Major League Soccer.

College
Coiner was born in Aliso Viejo, California. He played college soccer at the University of San Diego from 1999 to 2002. He was named West Coast Conference Player of the Year twice was a 2000 and 2002 NSCAA Second Team All-American. He is second all-time in school record books with forty-nine goals scored. In 2001, he played for the Southern California Seahorses during the collegiate off season. In 2003, he also played with Orange County Blue Star in the USL Premier Development League, where he played alongside Juergen Klinsmann.

Professional
Upon graduating he traveled to Germany to join Arminia Bielefeld's reserve side. After one season there appearing in twenty games with sixteen goals he was signed by German third-division side 1. FC Union Berlin. With Union Berlin he appeared in 32 matches, scoring twelve goals. The next season, he was signed by Holstein Kiel where he would appear in thirty-one matches and score ten goals. His success in the German leagues failed to earn him a long-term contract and he was released after the 2005-06 season.

On July 13, 2006, Coiner signed with the Columbus Crew of Major League Soccer. On January 12, 2007, the Crew traded Coiner, and a first round draft pick (second overall) in the 2007 MLS SuperDraft to the Chicago Fire in exchange for Andy Herron. Coiner retired before the 2007 season.

References

External links
 

1979 births
Living people
Association football forwards
American soccer players
American expatriate soccer players in Germany
Soccer players from California
Orange County Blue Star players
Columbus Crew players
Holstein Kiel players
Arminia Bielefeld players
1. FC Union Berlin players
Sportspeople from Aliso Viejo, California
Southern California Seahorses players
University of San Diego alumni
San Diego Toreros men's soccer players
USL League Two players
Major League Soccer players
American expatriate soccer players
Regionalliga players